Milton da Cruz (born 1 August 1957) is a Brazilian professional football coach and former player who played as a forward.

His career is widely related to São Paulo, club he represented as a player and served as an interim manager on a number of occasions before leaving in 2016.

Club career
Known as Milton in his playing days, he joined São Paulo's youth setup in 1975, being promoted to the first team in 1977. He subsequently represented Estudiantes Tecos, Nacional Montevideo, Internacional, Sport Recife, Catuense, Náutico, Yomiuri FC, Nissan Motors FC, Botafogo and Kashima Antlers.

In May 1993, Cruz joined Oklahoma City Slickers of the USISL. He was the club's topscorer, as his side finished third, and subsequently retired at the age of 36.

International career
Milton appeared with Brazil under-23s at the 1984 Summer Olympics in United States, appearing in three matches only as a substitute.

Post-playing career
In 1997 Milton Cruz returned to his first club São Paulo, as an assistant manager. In 1999, after Paulo César Carpegiani's dismissal, he was named interim.

Club statistics

Honours 
Figueirense
 Campeonato Catarinense: 2018

References

External links

1957 births
Living people
Footballers from São Paulo (state)
Brazilian footballers
Association football forwards
Campeonato Brasileiro Série A players
São Paulo FC players
Sport Club Internacional players
Sport Club do Recife players
Clube Náutico Capibaribe players
Botafogo de Futebol e Regatas players
Liga MX players
Tecos F.C. footballers
Club Nacional de Football players
Japan Soccer League players
J1 League players
Tokyo Verdy players
Kashima Antlers players
USISL players
Oklahoma City Slickers (USISL) players
Olympic footballers of Brazil
Footballers at the 1984 Summer Olympics
Olympic silver medalists for Brazil
Olympic medalists in football
Brazilian expatriate footballers
Brazilian expatriate sportspeople in Mexico
Brazilian expatriate sportspeople in Uruguay
Brazilian expatriate sportspeople in Japan
Brazilian expatriate sportspeople in the United States
Expatriate footballers in Mexico
Expatriate footballers in Uruguay
Expatriate footballers in Japan
Expatriate soccer players in the United States
Brazilian football managers
São Paulo FC managers
Clube Náutico Capibaribe managers
Campeonato Brasileiro Série A managers
Campeonato Brasileiro Série B managers
Medalists at the 1984 Summer Olympics
Figueirense FC managers
Sport Club do Recife managers
São Paulo FC non-playing staff
People from Cubatão